is a Japanese actress and former singer. In 2000, Kago debuted as a 4th generation member of the idol girl group Morning Musume. During her time in the group, she was also part of Mini-Moni and other Hello! Project sub-groups. In 2004, Kago departed from Morning Musume and became part of the duo W with Nozomi Tsuji.

In 2006, Kago was suspended from her agency for underage smoking and subsequently dismissed in 2007, forcing her to leave W and Hello! Project. In 2008, she returned to entertainment as an actress, appearing in Kung Fu Chefs (2009), Ju-On: Black Ghost (2009), and Battle of Demons (2009). In 2009, Kago returned to music as well, releasing her debut solo single, "No Hesitation" (2009), followed by her jazz album, Ai Kago Meets Jazz (2010). She also formed her own girl group, Girls Beat!!, in 2013, of which she remained a member until 2016.

Career

2000–2004: Morning Musume and Mini-Moni

At age 12, Kago won the 4th National Audition of Morning Musume held by the Up-Front Works in 2000. On April 15, she, along with Rika Ishikawa, Hitomi Yoshizawa, and Nozomi Tsuji, were inducted into the idol group Morning Musume as its fourth generation. Their recording debut was in the group's ninth single "Happy Summer Wedding".

Kago and Tsuji's addition to the group received positive critical response. With an increasing fan base, they, along with Morning Musume member Mari Yaguchi and Coconuts Musume member Mika Todd, formed a new subgroup named Mini-Moni. In addition to this, Kago was also admitted into established subgroup Tanpopo as a second generation member. From 2001 to 2004 Kago participated in the annual Hello! Project shuffle units (3-nin Matsuri in 2001, Happy 7 in 2002, Salt5 in 2003, and H.P. All Stars in 2004).

2004–2007: W

In August 2004, Kago and Tsuji graduated from Morning Musume together after Minimoni began their indefinite hiatus. Under the arrangement of their agency, Kago and Tsuji formed a new pop duo, W, releasing two albums and six singles together.

Before the release of their seventh single and their third album, W3: Faithful, on February 9, 2006, Friday published photos showing Kago smoking. She was 15 at the time the photos were taken. The following day, her agency issued a press statement saying that she and W's activities had been suspended "indefinitely." Kago spent the remainder of the year under house arrest at her family's residence in Nara. During this time, she was not allowed to have contact with Tsuji or any of the other members from her agency, and she was caught smoking again during her probation period.

In 2007 Up-Front Works reported that they were working on her comeback. In late March 2007, photos of Kago going to an onsen with a man 18 years her senior and smoking for a third time circulated in the media, further tarnishing her reputation. Not long after, Yuukichi Kawaguchi, the director of Up-Front Works, issued a statement announcing that she had been dismissed from the agency.

2008–2010: Return to entertainment
After Kago departed from Up-Front Agency, her mother attempted to sign her to a new talent agency in her hometown, Nara. Later that year, Josei Seven published an interview with her mother, revealing that Kago left Japan and started residing in New York City. Kago herself later revealed that she had actually not gone to New York, but rather to Los Angeles for three months because she felt like a criminal in Japan. During her stay, she met people who encouraged her, including Winona Ryder, and was able to reflect on her situation. She also considered suicide and cut her wrists.

Kago made a well-publicized return to the entertainment industry in 2008 with plans of pursuing an acting career. She began appearing in multiple Hong Kong movies, including Kung Fu Chefs. On August 25, 2008, Kago released a book entitled . On her blog, she described the book as "a book where I talk to young teens about their various troubles and dreams."

During 2009, Kago also focused on rebuilding her music career. On June 24, 2009, she released her first solo single "No HesitAtIon" [sic] on independent record label In Da Groove. On February 16, 2010, she held her first jazz concert at bar JZ Brat in Tokyo. Kago's first jazz album, Ai Kago meets Jazz: The First Door, was released on March 31, 2010 through P-Vine Records and Avex Marketing. In August 2010 she was invited to perform at music festival Summer Sonic.

2011–present: Personal struggles and Girls Beat!!
Throughout the second half of 2010, Kago became unhappy with the direction of her work. Around the same time, she began dating restaurant owner Haruhiko Ando, who acted as an in-between for her agency and herself. Since beginning a relationship with Ando, Kago cancelled several jobs at the last minute, causing her agency to suspend her activities. Despite this, she participated in a live performance and opened a separate blog without permission.

Kago parted ways with R&A Promotions in November 2010 despite her contract ending in March 2013. During that time, Kago's career was also derailed by her personal life.

After spending 2012 out of the public eye with the birth of her daughter, Minami, Kago transferred to a new agency in 2013. Planning to revive her music career, she formed an idol group, which was later named Girls Beat!! The group would be crowd-sourced using lyrics, music, and costume ideas submitted by fans. Remi Kita and Ryona Himeno were recruited as the other two members after passing the auditions.

Girls Beat!! released their first single, "Sekai Seifuku" on July 22, 2014. Their activities were abruptly put on hold when an arrest warrant was put out for Ando in October on suspicions of loaning money at illegal interest rates. Kago later filed for divorce, planning to continue activities once the divorce was finalized. Although Kago was eventually successful in doing so, in August 2015, her contract with her agency expired, though she continued activities with Girls Beat!! in November. On February 29, 2016, she graduated from the group.

Personal life

Public image
During Kago's years in Mini-Moni, she was known for keeping her hair in curled twin tails. Manga artist Arina Tanemura used her hairstyle as inspiration for Mitsuki Koyama, the main character of Full Moon o Sagashite. Her official nickname in Hello! Project was "Aibon."

They set their record on January 1, 2004, during a live New Year's Day television special at Nippon Television Network, Tokyo, Japan. The record appeared in the 2005 and 2006 editions of the Guinness Book of World Records before it was broken by Ashrita Furman in September 2005.

Relationships and family
During Kago's house arrest in 2006, her parents divorced. In 2009, Kago was involved in a relationship with actor Hidejiro Mizumoto. Mizumoto's wife, Asato, sued them both, stating that she had proof of the affair and that it was the cause for her pending divorce. Shukan Josei reported in 2010 that Kago was romantically linked to model Takeshi Mikawai. Her agency released a statement claiming that while they dated, they were not a couple.

Kago began dating Haruhiko Ando, a restaurant owner in Roppongi, in August 2010, who acted as an in-between between her agency and herself. In September 2011, Ando was arrested for alleged extortion and claiming to have connections with the yakuza. Kago had been taken in for questioning. In the same month, Kago was rushed to a nearby hospital after agency officials found her on the floor of her apartment with cuts to her wrists. Her life was reported to be not in danger, though there were speculations that it was a planned suicide. Following the incident, she and Ando registered their marriage, and Kago became pregnant. and he took on her family name, Kago. From their marriage, Kago gave birth to her first child, Minami, on June 22, 2012.

The police issued an arrest warrant for Ando in October 2014 on suspicion of loaning money at illegal interest rates. This affected both Kago's career and image. In 2015, Kago announced through her official blog that they were living separately and were in the process of working towards a divorce. She attempted to file for divorce in April, but dropped charges due to insufficient funds. On June 9, Ando was arrested on domestic violence charges stemming from an incident on May 12 where he allegedly shoved and kicked Kago in their home in Roppongi, leaving her with injuries that took ten days to heal. Kago agreed to drop all charges in exchange for divorce, which was finalized later that month.

On August 8, 2016, Kago announced that she had married a 38-year-old beautician whose name was not disclosed to the public. On September 23, 2016, she announced that she was pregnant with her second child. On February 23, 2017, she announced on her blog that she gave birth her second child, a boy named Yoshitsugu.

Discography 

Singles

Albums
 AI KAGO meets JAZZ (March 31, 2010 P-Vine)

Compilations
  (Various Artists, February 10, 2010 P-Vine)
 Lum no Love Song (Urusei Yatsura OP) / Ai Kago × Brian Hardgroove (Public Enemy)
 Himitsu no Akko-chan (Himitsu no Akko-chan OP) / Ai Kago × Paolo Scotti

Filmography

Film

Television

Publications

Books

Photobooks

DVDs

References

External links 

 Official blog 
 

1988 births
Japanese child singers
Japanese women jazz singers
Japanese women pop singers
Happy 7 members
Living people
Minimoni members
Morning Musume members
Tanpopo members
Writers from Nara Prefecture
Salt5 members
W (group) members
Japanese idols
Musicians from Nara Prefecture
20th-century Japanese actresses
21st-century Japanese actresses
Actors from Nara Prefecture
20th-century Japanese women singers
20th-century Japanese singers
21st-century Japanese women singers
21st-century Japanese singers